Events from the year 1925 in Denmark.

Incumbents
 Monarch – Christian X
 Prime minister – Thorvald Stauning

Events

Sports
 15 October  Hvidovre IF is founded.

Date unknown
 Kjøbenhavns Boldklub wins their sixth Danish football championship by defeating Aarhus Gymnastikforening 92 in the final of the 1924–25 Danish National Football Tournament.

Births
 23 May – Rigmor Mydtskov, photographer (died 2010)
 20 August – Henning Larsen, architect (died 2013)
 15 September – Helle Virkner, actress and Danish First Lady (died 2009)

Deaths
 1 April – Lars Jørgen Madsen, multiple Olympic medalist in rifle shooting (born 1871)
 13 April – Frederik Buch, film actor of the silent film era (born 1875)
 25 October – Adolf Heinrich-Hansen, painter (died 1859)
 Kristiane Konstantin-Hansen, weaver, textile artist, retailer and feminist (born 1848)

References

 
Denmark
Years of the 20th century in Denmark
1920s in Denmark
1925 in Europe